Monka Hill is a mountain located in the Catskill Mountains of New York north-northwest of Pine Hill. Monka Hill is located east of Rose Mountain.

References

Mountains of Delaware County, New York
Mountains of New York (state)